Red is a 2008 American thriller film based on a novel by Jack Ketchum and directed by Trygve Allister Diesen and Lucky McKee. It concerns one man's revenge after his beloved dog is shot to death after his owner doesn't have enough money to satisfy an attempted robber. The screenplay was written by Stephen Susco based on the novel. It premiered at the Sundance Film Festival in 2008.

Plot
Avery "Ave" Ludlow, a storekeeper, has a dog named Red, a gift for his 50th birthday from his late wife, Mary. One day, fishing at a lake with Red by his side, three boys come across his path: brothers Danny and Harold McCormack, and their friend Pete Doust. Danny threatens Ave with a shotgun and demands money. When Avery says he has only $30, Danny becomes furious and kills Red. He laughs and makes a joke about it as he leaves with the other boys.

Ave visits a gun store, where the clerk identifies Danny as the shotgun purchaser based on a description. Ave visits Danny's father, Michael, and tells his story. Michael calls his sons, and asks them if they shot Red. They deny it, and Michael tells Ave to leave.

Ave decides to ask for a prosecution and talks to his lawyer, Sam Berry. Sam discourages him by saying that the penalty is low, but Ave persists. Sam arranges a meeting between Ave and a reporter named Carrie. Carrie tells him that publicity would prompt official action. Ave agrees and gives a human-interest television interview to Carrie. However, the story fails to get attention, and Carrie is transferred to another story. Ave switches to pursuing a civil lawsuit for damages. A rock with a threatening message is thrown through his window.

Carrie asks Ave about his family; he tells her his elder son was mendacious, and was thrown out of the Navy due to mental illness. One day, he returned home and asked his mother for money. She refused, and he assaulted her. Thinking he had killed her, he then set fire to his brother and mother with kerosene. The brother died while Mary survived for five days in a coma.

Ave begins following the boys. Harold sees Ave watching them and, remorseful, apologizes. Ave says he would like Danny to do likewise. One day, Danny is playing baseball with friends and becomes frustrated after striking out, leaving the game in anger. Ave follows him and parks behind his car. Danny confronts him and, needled by Ave, tries to hit him with his bat. Ave avoids the blow and knocks Danny down; Ave points out that, as Danny attacked in daylight and with witnesses, he should watch his temper, saying the beating Ave has given him is one his father should have given. Shortly afterwards, Ave's store is burned down. Ave is disappointed to hear that no evidence implicates the McCormacks.

Ave exhumes Red and takes him to the McCormacks' house, confronting them with it. Michael and Danny brandish pistols, with the father demanding he leave. Ave refuses, at which Danny becomes furious, stepping forward and aiming at Ave. Ave deflects Danny's arm as he fires, and the shot hits Ave's ear. Ave wrestles Danny's gun from him, throws him to the ground, and holds him hostage. Telling Michael to lower his gun, Ave forces Danny to drive to the sheriff, where he intends to have Danny charged with attempted manslaughter. Michael follows Ave and rams his truck off the road. The McCormacks return home, thinking Ave is dead. Night falls, during which Ave regains consciousness and sees an Australian Cattle Dog that shows him Danny's revolver, left in the wreckage. He takes it and returns to the McCormack house. Finding a shaken Harold smoking on the porch, he asks to be led to where Red's body was dumped. Michael, Danny, and Pete follow and find them. Michael and Danny are again armed; Harold tells them to stand down, but Danny shoots Ave in the belly with the shotgun. Ave returns fire, wounding both Danny and Michael. As they fall, they fire back: in the crossfire, Harold and Pete are fatally shot. Ave approaches the injured Danny and Michael, telling the father that one of them killed Harold.

As he recuperates, Ave reads a newspaper with Carrie's account of his story. Carrie visits and gives him a dog. Ave initially declines, reminding her that two boys were killed because he wanted revenge; she leaves him with the dog. Despite his protests, Ave soon accepts him.

Cast
Brian Cox as Avery "Ave" Ludlow
Kyle Gallner as Harold McCormack
Noel Fisher as Danny McCormack
Tom Sizemore as Michael McCormack
Shiloh Fernandez as Pete Doust
Robert Englund as Willie Doust
Amanda Plummer as Mrs. Doust
Ashley Laurence as Mrs. McCormack
Kim Dickens as Carrie
Richard Riehle as Sam Berry
Jack Ketchum as Bartender (credited under his real name, Dallas Mayr)

Awards and nominations
Brian Cox won for Best Actor at the Sitges Film Festival. Red was also nominated for Best Film (Trygve Allister Diesen, Lucky McKee).

Reception

On Rotten Tomatoes the film holds an approval rating of 70% based on 27 reviews, with an average rating of 6.2/10. The site's critical consensus reads, "This vengeance film leans heavily on attack-and-avenge scenarios but performances by Brian Cox and Tom Sizemore take the stink out of any weaker scripting." On Metacritic the film has a weighted average score of 61 out of 100, based on 7 critics, indicating "generally favorable reviews".

See also

References

External links

2008 films
2008 thriller films
American films about revenge
American thriller films
Films about dogs
Films about pets
Films based on American novels
Films directed by Lucky McKee
Films shot in California
Films shot in Maryland
Magnolia Pictures films
2000s English-language films
2000s American films